Historical Social Research is a quarterly peer-reviewed academic journal covering political science, social science, cultural studies, and history. It is the official journal of the QUANTUM association and is published by GESIS – Leibniz Institute for the Social Sciences. The journal was established in 1976 as QUANTUM Information and was renamed Historical Social Research/Historische Sozialforschung in 1979, with the inclusion of both English and German titles representing the original bilingual nature of the journal. Due to the internationalization of the journal over the past few decades, its title was shortened in 2021 to the current one. The editors-in-chief are  Wilhelm Heinz Schröder and Heinrich Best.

Abstracting and indexing
The journal is abstracted and indexed in:
EBSCO databases
International Bibliography of Periodical Literature
International Bibliography of the Social Sciences
Scopus
Social Sciences Citation Index
Sociological Abstracts
According to the Journal Citation Reports, the journal has a 2020 impact factor of 0.472.

References

External links

Publications established in 1976
Social history journals
Multilingual journals
Delayed open access journals
Quarterly journals